Usman Iqbal Gondal (born 1987) is a retired Pakistani international footballer. He retired from football in February 2007.

Career

Club career
Gondal was born in Derby, England, and played youth football for both Nottingham Forest and Leicester City. Gondal signed for non-league side Arnold Town in September 2006.

International career
Gondal made his debut international appearance for Pakistan in 2006. In doing so, he became one of a number of British-born footballers to represent Pakistan at international level.

References

External links

1987 births
Living people
English people of Pakistani descent
English footballers
Pakistani footballers
Pakistan international footballers
Nottingham Forest F.C. players
Leicester City F.C. players
Arnold Town F.C. players
British sportspeople of Pakistani descent
British Asian footballers
Footballers from Derby
Association football midfielders